O-zone is a science fiction novel by the American author Paul Theroux published in 1986.

Synopsis
Missouri is a nuclear wasteland after leakage of stored radioactive waste, off limits to all but the very rich. Eight of them, referred to as 'Owners', visit this O-Zone as their personal playground. Some of them come to the disturbing realizations that the life-forms outside of their walled in cities, assumed to be just 'things', seem as human as the Owners themselves.

References

External links

1986 American novels
American science fiction novels
Novels by Paul Theroux
Novels set in Missouri
Dystopian novels
Post-apocalyptic novels
Novels set in the 2020s